Buccaneer Bay Provincial Park is a provincial park in British Columbia, Canada, located 17 km west of Sechelt on North Thormanby Island, offshore from the community of Halfmoon Bay.

External links

Provincial parks of British Columbia
Sunshine Coast (British Columbia)
Provincial Parks of the Gulf Islands
1989 establishments in British Columbia